HBsAg (also known as the Australia antigen) is the surface antigen of the hepatitis B virus (HBV). Its presence in blood indicates current hepatitis B infection.

Structure and function

The viral envelope of an enveloped virus has different surface proteins from the rest of the virus which act as antigens. These antigens are recognized by antibody proteins that bind specifically to one of these surface proteins.

Immunoassay
Today, these antigen-proteins can be genetically manufactured (e.g. transgene E. coli) to produce material for a simple antigen test, which detects the presence of HBV.

It is present in the sera of patients with viral hepatitis B (with or without clinical symptoms). Patients who developed antibodies against HBsAg (anti-HBsAg seroconversion) are usually considered non-infectious. HBsAg detection by immunoassay is used in blood screening, to establish a diagnosis of hepatitis B infection in the clinical setting (in combination with other disease markers) and to monitor antiviral treatment.

In histopathology, the presence of HBsAg is more commonly demonstrated by the use of the Shikata orcein technique, which uses a natural dye to bind to the antigen in infected liver cells.

Positive HBsAg tests can be due to recent vaccination against Hepatitis B virus but this positivity is unlikely to persist beyond 14 days post-vaccination.

History
It is commonly referred to as the Australia Antigen. This is because it was first isolated by the American research physician and Nobel Prize winner Baruch S. Blumberg in the serum of an Australian Aboriginal person.  It was discovered to be part of the virus that caused serum hepatitis by virologist Alfred Prince in 1968.

Heptavax, a "first-generation" hepatitis B vaccine in the 1980s, was made from HBsAg extracted from the blood plasma of hepatitis patients. Current vaccine are made from recombinant HBsAg grown in yeast.

See also 
HBcAg
HBeAg

References 

Viral structural proteins
Hepatitis B virus
Antigens